Les Baxter's Jungle Jazz is an album by Les Baxter and His Orchestra. It was released in 1959 on the Capitol label (catalog no. T-1184). Plas Johnson is featured on tenor sax and alto flute. The music was composed by Baxter.

Upon its release designated it as "A Billboard Pick" and wrote: "This is a real swinger from start to finish. . . . The treatments are colorful, and the sound is excellent. . . . Buffs and bugs will take to this."

Track listing
Side 1
 "Brazilia"
 "Rain Forest"
 "Papagayo"
 "Amazon Falls"
 "Coco"
 "Carnival Merengue"

Side 2
 "Isle of Cuba"
 "Blue Jungle"
 "Voodoo Dreams"
 "One Thousand Cockatoos"
 "Go Chango"
 "Jungle Brava"

References

1959 albums
Capitol Records albums
Les Baxter albums